The Libyan Football Federation (abbreviated as LFF) is the governing body of football in Libya. It was founded in 1962, affiliated to FIFA in 1964 and to CAF in 1965. It organizes the national football league and the national team.

Post-revolution status
During the 2011 Libyan civil war, the football team continued to play, completing their 2012 African Cup of Nations qualification match against Mozambique behind closed doors on neutral territory in Cairo.

References

External links
 Official website
  Former Libyan Football Federation
 Libya at the FIFA website
  Libya at CAF Online

Libya
Football in Libya
Football
Sports organizations established in 1962